Zhongshan District is one of the seven districts of Dalian, Liaoning province, People's Republic of China, forming part of the urban core.

Administrative divisions
There are 6 subdistricts within the district.

Subdistricts:
Navy Square Subdistrict
Renmin Road Subdistrict
Qingniwaqiao Subdistrict
Kuiying Subdistrict
Taoyuan Subdistrict
Laohutan Subdistrict

Education
International schools include:
 Japanese School of Dalian
The following secondary schools are within Zhongshan District:
Dalian No. 2 High School
Dalian No. 9 Middle School
Dalian No. 15 High School
Dalian No. 16 High School
Dalian No. 24 High School
Dalian No. 39 Middle School
The following universities are within Zhongshan District:
PLA Dalian Naval Academy

References

External links

Districts of Dalian